Plato is an unincorporated community within the Rural Municipality of Snipe Lake No. 259, Saskatchewan, Canada. The community was named after Plato, Minnesota, which had been the home town of Richard and Agnes Brust, early pioneers.

The town is a few hundred yards off Saskatchewan Highway 44.  While the highway is paved, the town itself contains only gravel roads, and several houses remain abandoned.  The town retains a small post office.

See also

 List of communities in Saskatchewan

References

Snipe Lake No. 259, Saskatchewan
Former villages in Saskatchewan
Unincorporated communities in Saskatchewan